Fatal Contact: Bird Flu in America is an ABC two-hour TV movie which first aired May 9, 2006 in which an American businessman visiting China is infected and carries the deadly mutated bird flu virus back via jetliner to the USA, soon it spreads throughout the country then the rest of the world. Before the movie ends, riots erupt, armed mobs try to hijack vaccines and authorities predict that up to 350 million people will die worldwide."

Plot summary
A mutated bird flu virus spreads across the world. As panic spreads, the governor of Virginia quarantines neighborhoods where cases have cropped up, and federal officials confess they have no vaccine and scant supplies of antiviral drugs. Major socioeconomic disruption sets in, with shortages of food and medical supplies, power outages, and riots in the streets of New York.

A second civil war even erupts in the United States. Eventually, the pandemic begins to subside. But in the final scene, the discovery that an entire Angolan village was wiped out by a new mutation of the virus and a second wave of cases will begin causes further panic.

Cast
 Joely Richardson as Dr. Iris Varnack
 Stacy Keach as Collin Reed
 Ann Cusack as Denise Connelly
 Justina Machado as Alma Ansen
 Scott Cohen as Governor Mike Newsome
 David Ramsey as Curtis Ansen
 John Atkinson as Ed Connelly
 Carolyn Dando as Lauren Connelly
 Kodi Smit-McPhee as Toby Connelly

Reception
The editorial staff at CIDRAP (Center for Infectious Disease Research and Policy) at the University of Minnesota write: "The creators of the fictional ABC-TV movie Fatal Contact: Bird Flu in America blended medical facts from the 1918 influenza pandemic with current predictions from flu experts to portray a contemporary flu pandemic, but they added a liberal dash of sensationalism. The disease shown in the film, aired May 9, bore a strong resemblance to the illness that killed an estimated 675,000 Americans in 1918 and 1919. And a good many of the issues raised came straight out of the US government's pandemic preparedness plans and recent news stories about possible pandemic scenarios. But some scenes and details went well beyond what happened in 1918 or what is plausible today. And along the way, important medical details were left out."

Sources and notes

External links

American Broadcasting Company original programming
American television films
2006 television films
2006 films
Films directed by Richard Pearce
Films about influenza outbreaks
2000s English-language films
Sony Pictures direct-to-video films